Belenois gidica, the African veined white or pointed caper, is a butterfly in the family Pieridae. It is found in the Afrotropical realm.

Its flight period is year-round.

The larvae feed on Boscia, Capparis, and Maerua species.

Subspecies
The following subspecies are recognised:
 B. g. gidica (Mauritania, Senegal, Gambia, Burkina Faso, Ghana, Ivory Coast, northern Nigeria, Niger)
 B. g. hypoxantha (Ungemach, 1932) (Ethiopia)
 B. g. abyssinica (Lucas, 1852) (Ethiopia, Kenya, Uganda, south-eastern Democratic Republic of the Congo to Zambia, Mozambique, Zimbabwe, Botswana, northern Namibia, South Africa, Eswatini)

References

External links
Seitz, A. Die Gross-Schmetterlinge der Erde 13: Die Afrikanischen Tagfalter. Plate XIII 13
Seitz, A. Die Gross-Schmetterlinge der Erde 13: Die Afrikanischen Tagfalter. Plate XIII 12

Pierini
Butterflies of Africa
Butterflies described in 1819
Taxa named by Jean-Baptiste Godart